Wiegenlied (German for "lullaby") may refer to:

Wiegenlied (Brahms), the composer's op. 49 no. 4
Schlafe, mein Prinzchen, schlaf' ein, an 18th century German lullaby to words by  Friedrich Wilhelm Gotter
"Wiegenlied, D 498" (Schubert), "Schlafe, schlafe, holder, süßer Knabe" and two other songs by Franz Schubert
Wiegenlied, a song from Fünf Lieder, Op. 41, by Richard Strauss

See also
Lullaby (disambiguation)